Weifaer Höhe is a mountain of Saxony, southeastern Germany.

Mountains of Saxony
Lusatian Highlands